ZPG Ltd. is a British real estate company based in London, England, owned by Silver Lake Partners. 

Its brands include the property website Zoopla, price comparison service Uswitch, finance comparison website Money.co.uk, personal finance content site Bankrate UK, PrimeLocation and Hometrack. Alongside these sites, Zoopla also owns several industry brands providing services to estate agents. These include Jupix, Alto, Expert Agent and Ravensworth. ZPG PLC was listed on the London Stock Exchange until it was acquired by Silver Lake Partners in July 2018.

History
The company was originally founded as Zoopla in 2007 by Alex Chesterman and Simon Kain. Chesterman and Kain also founded ScreenSelect (later LoveFilm).  The Zoopla website was launched in January 2008. Zoopla was backed by Accomplice, Octopus Ventures and other investors. In July 2009, Zoopla acquired property website Thinkproperty.com from the Guardian Media Group. 

In August 2009, Zoopla acquired the PropertyFinder Group, consisting of the websites Propertyfinder.com, Hotproperty.co.uk and UK Property Shop, from prior owners the REA Group and News International for an undisclosed sum. These businesses had combined annual revenues of £7m. In January 2011 Zoopla acquired the historic database of UK house prices HousePrices.co.uk.

In October 2011, Zoopla and Digital Property Group, the subsidiary of A&N Media, operating property websites Primelocation.com, Globrix.com and FindaProperty.com, merged their respective businesses. In May 2012, Zoopla acquired property information website UpMyStreet.com. 

In June 2012, Zoopla and its constabularies formed Zoopla Property Group Ltd. In December 2012, Zoopla acquired property information website Globrix.com. In Spring 2013, Stephen Morana, formerly of Betfair Group Plc, was appointed new Chief Financial Officer (CFO). Zoopla's biggest shareholder, the Daily Mail and General Trust floated Zoopla on the London Stock Exchange in June 2014.

In June 2015, Zoopla bought the price comparison website Uswitch. In February 2017 the company changed its name to ZPG plc. In September 2017, Zoopla purchased the financial services comparison website Money.co.uk for £140 million.

In May 2018, US private equity firm Silver Lake Partners made a $2.2 Billion bid for the company. The transaction completed in July 2018.

Operations
ZPG owns a searchable directory of UK residential properties. It uses various open sources including the Royal Mail's postcode database, the HM Land Registry's data on property transactions in England and Wales, and Google maps. 

Based on this data, Zoopla has developed an automated valuation model, powered by Hometrack, that provides a computed valuation estimate for UK residential properties. Zoopla also allows users to claim their home or set a TemptMe price, similar to US website Zillow. Its analogue for valuing the Internet properties is DNPric.es. The accuracy of Zoopla's computed valuations is disputed.

Sponsorship
ZPG sponsored West Bromwich Albion Football Club from 2012  to January 2014. Founder Alex Chesterman, who is Jewish, decided to remove support of the club after an allegedly anti-Semitic gesture from player Nicolas Anelka made headlines.

See also

Property portal
Rightmove
Commercial People
Nestoria
Nuroa
Zillow
OnTheMarket

References

External links
 ZPG website
 Zoopla

Real estate companies established in 2007
British real estate websites
Real estate valuation
Property services companies of the United Kingdom
British companies established in 2007
Online real estate databases
Internet properties established in 2007
Privately held companies of the United Kingdom
Silver Lake (investment firm) companies